Port Nolloth is a town and small domestic seaport in the Namaqualand region on the northwestern coast of South Africa,  northwest of Springbok. It is the seat of the Richtersveld Local Municipality.

The port was previously a transshipment point for copper from the Okiep mines, and diamonds from the Namaqua coast. Since the 1970s the  principal seagoing activities have been fishing and small-vessel tourism. Today the town is a sleepy commercial hub with a number of holiday homes and a caravan park at the adjacent McDougalls Bay.

History
The bay upon which the port sits was known by the indigenous Namaqua people as Aukwatowa ("Where the water took away the old man"). Its location was marked by Portuguese explorer Bartolomeu Dias on his epic voyage around the Cape of Good Hope in 1487. It was the last landfall he sighted before a wild storm blew his ship off course and out to sea for 13 days.

The Cape Colony administration immediately commenced a survey of the coastline to locate a suitable harbour from which to ship the copper ore. Aukwatowa bay was surveyed in 1854, and selected for a future port based largely on its sheltered aspect from offshore winds.

Copper shipments

A rudimentary quay was built in 1855, wide enough to accommodate the horse-drawn wagons that carried the copper ore from Okiep to the port. A small service town rapidly developed and was named Port Nolloth by Cape Colony Governor Sir George Grey, in honour of its surveyor, Captain M.S. Nolloth.

However, while the railway significantly improved overland transport to the port, the increasing size of ore carriers began to create navigational difficulties in the bay. By the early 1900s, the sheltered aspect that had attracted surveyors fifty years before was proving too difficult for larger vessels, several of which ran aground on a coastal reef extending across the channel. The difficulties of the harbour and expensive ship repairs encouraged the development of an alternative transport route and by 1910 most Okiep ore was being carried by truck to the railhead at Bitterfontein in preference to shipments direct from the port.

Diamond mining
With ore shipments declining, the Port was revived in 1926 with the discovery of alluvial diamonds along the coast to the north and south of the town. A rush of prospectors and investment re-established Port Nolloth as a substantial service centre, even as copper shipments ceased altogether in 1944.

The inability of larger vessels to enter the port led to a series of disasters as ships attempted to anchor offshore rather than seek shelter in poor weather. In April 1947, the 205-ton South African freighter Border ran aground to the south of the port while attempting to ride out a storm. In December 1950, the 400-ton freighter Bechuana suffered a similar fate.

In the years following these wrecks, efforts were made to improve port access with the underwater blasting of the coastal reef. The attempt was partially successful but the bay remained a challenging prospect. Demand for port access also declined in the 1970s as the volume of diamond exports  decreased.

The diamonds in Port Nolloth are now almost all gone and divers are struggling to make a living. It is very rare that a big haul gets mined with a value over R500 000 in any given trip. Income now average between R30 000 and R40 000 per month for the more experienced divers.

Closure of the Port 
After 1976, large-scale shipping at Port Nolloth was reduced to a single tanker, the Oranjemund, which visited the port fortnightly to exchange supplies for fish and diamonds. 61 metres long but with a draft of only 4.4 metres, the Oranjemund was well-suited for the navigational difficulties of the bay. However, the gradual reduction in diamond discoveries made the long voyage from Cape Town uneconomic, and the Oranjemund was withdrawn from service in 2006. Port activity now consists of minor fishing vessels and recreational boating. Silting of the harbour floor has further reduced the draft, and only the smallest vessels can access the 67-metre quay.

Climate
The cold Benguela Current in the Atlantic Ocean off the west coast of South Africa moderates the climate of the coastal region to a huge degree. The average daily maximum in summer is only just above  with a variation of less than 4 degrees between the hottest and coldest months of the year at Port Nolloth. The west coast is regularly frequented by a thick fog bank rolling in from the cold ocean, a phenomenon locally known as the Malmokkie.

Tourism

Port Nolloth Museum
The Port Nolloth Museum is situated in Port Nolloth, a small town and domestic seaport located in the Namaqualand region of the Northern Cape. The building which houses the museum was built in 1880 and was only transformed into a museum in the 2000s.

Showcasing the rich history and culture of Port Nolloth was the core idea of the museum as it has artifacts, photographs and relics from up to hundreds of years ago.

Founder
The museum was founded by Grazia de Beer who was born in Italy and moved to South Africa in her early years to attend the Springfield Convent school in Cape Town. She later went on to study a BA degree at the University of Cape Town. Upon completion, she wed Coen de Beer who was a diamond diver in Port Nolloth and moved to the town in the 1980s. 
Once here, she started taking an interest in Port Nolloth and conducted research on its history and collected artifacts and photographs for a period of 20 years. To make her discoveries known by the people of the town, she opened the Port Nolloth Museum.

Museum relics
The museum houses an eclectic collection of items including:
porcelain shards from shipwrecks
slave bracelets that washed up on the port of the town from a ship called  
antique medicine bottles that contain citronella oil and liquorice powder
an antique Nama bible
ostrich-shell fragments used by the Khoi and San for water containers
 Khoi clay pot pieces

The museum also contains a large collection of photographs and artifacts from the time of copper ore shipments between 1854 and 1920. With the development of mining, the Port Nolloth harbour became a greater significance as one of two harbours used for the export of copper ore and more importantly, for the import of food and capital equipment.

The museum also contains photos and artifacts of the diamond mining period. The town declined in the early 1900s but was revived with the discovery of alluvial diamonds in the area in 1926. The harbour was deepened and enlarged in the 1970s and diamond mines, diamond diving and fishery continue to operate in the area

See also
Namaqualand Railway

References

Ports and harbours of South Africa
Populated places established in 1854
Populated places in the Richtersveld Local Municipality
Ports and harbours of the Atlantic Ocean
Namaqualand
1854 establishments in the Cape Colony